New Waltham is a village and civil parish in North East Lincolnshire, England. It is situated just south of Grimsby and Cleethorpes, close to the A16 (Louth Road), and between the villages of Waltham and Humberston.

The village originates from the opening of the East Lincolnshire Railway in 1848, which had a station built here to serve the neighbouring villages. Waltham Humberston Station had a station house and three station cottages. New housing gradually developed around the station site, with a large building phase throughout the 1950s. Previously part of Waltham parish, the parish of New Waltham was created in 1961. The village population at the 2001 census was 4,557, increasing to 5,214 at the 2011 census.

The main road is the B1219, named Station Road in the west (passing the former station) and continuing to the east as Humberston Avenue. The A16 by-passes the village to the west, and meets the B1219 at Toll Bar Roundabout.

The village has three schools: Enfield Primary School, New Waltham Academy and the secondary school, Tollbar Academy, which is the largest in the region and between the village and Waltham.

There is a village hall just off Station Road, owned by the Parish Council, but run via an elected committee under the charities commission/Parish Council. Within the grounds is a small children's play area (in disrepair) and a small football pitch.

A second, more modern hall known as the Community Pavilion is found on St. Clements Way. This is owned and run by the Parish Council. It includes 5 football changing rooms that lead onto 2 full size football pitches.

To the side is a disused bowling green.  Plans have been shared by the Parish Council to turn this into a children's play area - including specific access for the disabled.

Governance
New Waltham is part of the Cleethorpes parliamentary constituency, and has been represented by Martin Vickers of the Conservative Party since 2010. North East Lincolnshire Council has one electoral ward covering New Waltham, which is Humberston and New Waltham.

References

External links

 Enfield Primary School

Villages in Lincolnshire
Borough of North East Lincolnshire
Civil parishes in Lincolnshire